Abiathar ben Elijah ha-Cohen (c. 1040 – 1109), was the last Palestinian Gaon. He succeeded his father Rabbi Elijah to the gaonate in 1083. He was deposed for a period following a violent quarrel with the Egyptian exilarch David ben Daniel who aspired to dominate Palestinian Jewry. After having fled to Syria in 1093, he later returned to his position following the fall of David ben Daniel. An account of these events was discovered in the Cairo genizah.

References 

Geonim